The Lilly Research Centre is a medical research centre in Surrey. It is the European headquarters of Eli Lilly and Company.

History
In 1968, when the centre opened, Eli Lilly was spending £20m on research in the UK. The average research cost of a new molecular entity is currently over £1bn. In 2003, a £40m investment transformed the site into a Centre of Excellence in Neuroscience Research.

Prince Andrew, Duke of York visited the site on 11 June 2003.

In October 2019, Eli Lilly announced the closure of their Erl Wood research centre by the end of 2020 with some staff moving to other Eli Lilly locations in the local area and neuroscience research moving to the USA. A year later, in October 2020, UCB announced they had acquired the site from Lilly and would complete a refurbishment of the site.

Directors
 David Dennen
 John Wold 1983-
 Karin Briner 2007-10

Structure
It is accessed via the A30 and B3020, and the A322 via junction 3 of the M3. The site has a 200-seat restaurant. The EMC building opened in 2000. The site is set in woodland.

See also
 British Neuroscience Association
 Napp Research Centre in South Cambridgeshire

References

External links
 Lilly Research Centre
 UK Biotech Database

1967 establishments in England
Buildings and structures in Surrey
Commercial buildings completed in 1967
Eli Lilly and Company
Health in Surrey
Neuroscience research centres in the United Kingdom
Pharmaceutical industry in the United Kingdom
Pharmaceutical research institutes
Research institutes established in 1967
Research institutes in Surrey